Antilegomena (from Greek ) are written texts whose authenticity or value is disputed. Eusebius in his Church History (c. 325) used the term for those Christian scriptures that were "disputed", literally "spoken against", in Early Christianity before the closure of the New Testament canon. 

The antilegomena were widely read in the Early Church and included the Epistle of James, the Epistle of Jude, 2 Peter, 2 and 3 John, the Book of Revelation, the Gospel of the Hebrews, the Epistle to the Hebrews, the Apocalypse of Peter, the Acts of Paul, the Shepherd of Hermas, the Epistle of Barnabas and the Didache. There was disagreement in the Early Church on whether or not the respective texts deserved canonical status.

Eusebius

The first major church historian, Eusebius,  who wrote his Church History c. AD 325, applied the Greek term "antilegomena" to the disputed writings of the Early Church:

It is a matter of categorical discussion whether Eusebius divides his books into three groups—homologoumena (from Greek , "accepted"), antilegomena, and 'heretical'—or into four by adding a notha ("spurious") group.

The Epistle to the Hebrews had earlier been listed:

Codex Sinaiticus, a 4th-century text and possibly one of the Fifty Bibles of Constantine, includes the Shepherd of Hermas and the Epistle of Barnabas.  The original Peshitta (NT portion is c. 5th century) excluded 2 and 3 John, 2 Peter, Jude, and Revelation.  Some modern editions, such as the Lee Peshitta of 1823, include them.

Reformation
During the Reformation, Luther brought up the issue of the antilegomena. Though he included the Letter to the Hebrews, the letters of James and Jude and Revelation in his Bible translation, he put them into a separate grouping and questioned their legitimacy. Hence, these books are sometimes termed "Luther's Antilegomena" Current Lutheran usage expands this questioning to also include 2 Peter, 2 John, and 3 John. - a terminology remains in use today.  

F. C. Baur used the term in his classification of the Pauline Epistles, classing Romans, 1–2 Corinthians and Galatians as homologoumena; Ephesians, Philippians, Colossians, 1–2 Thessalonians and Philemon as antilegomena; and the Pastoral Epistles as "notha" (spurious writings).

Hebrew Bible
The term is sometimes applied also to certain books in the Hebrew Bible.

See also
 Development of the Hebrew Bible canon
 Development of the Old Testament canon
 Development of the New Testament canon
 Luther's canon

Notes

References

Bibliography

 .
 .
 .

External links
 
 
 .
 
 

 
4th-century introductions
Ancient Christian controversies
Christian terminology
Development of the Christian biblical canon
Eusebius
Lutheran theology